Ellin may refer to:

Abby Ellin, American author and journalist
Doug Ellin (born 1968), American screenwriter and director
Everett Ellin (1928-2011), American museum official, art dealer, engineer, lawyer, and talent agent
Percy Ellin (1884-1959), Australian footballer
Ray Ellin American comedian, talk show host, producer, writer, and director
Robert Ellin (1837-1904), English-born American stone and wood sculptor
Stanley Ellin (1916-1986), American mystery writer
Tony Ellin (1965-2000), American professional pool player